Islanders FC is a British Virgin Islands football club based in Tortola, competing in the BVIFA National League, the top tier of British Virgin Islands football.

Islanders FC are the current defending league champions and are the most successful football club of all time from the BVI.

Current squad

Achievements
BVIFA National League: 7
2009–10, 2010–11, 2011–12, 2012–13, 2013–14, 2014–15, 2016–17.

References

Islanders